Champion Mill, in Lake County, Colorado, is part of a mining complex on the eastern slope of Mount Champion on Halfmoon Creek.  Established in the 1890s, it was a consistent supplier of gold and silver, as well as galena and pyrite to the smelters in Leadville, CO. The mine and mill operated until around 1919, when the price to ship the ore to Leadville became too expensive to maintain a profit.

Colorado Mining Boom
Buildings and structures in Lake County, Colorado
Mines in Colorado